A Greek Tragedy is a 1985 Belgian animated short film written and directed by Nicole Van Goethem about three lady statues holding on to the remains of an ancient building.

Accolades
The film won the Academy Award for Best Animated Short Film at the 59th Academy Awards.

References

External links

 
 

1985 films
1985 animated films
1980s animated short films
Belgian animated films
Animated films based on classical mythology
Films set in Greece
Best Animated Short Academy Award winners
1980s Dutch-language films